Monkwearmouth Hospital is a mental health facility on Newcastle Road, Monkwearmouth, Sunderland, England. It is managed by the Cumbria, Northumberland, Tyne and Wear NHS Foundation Trust.

History
The hospital has its origins in the Monkwearmouth and Southwick Dispensary which was established on Roker Road in July 1873 through the efforts of the Reverend Canon Miles, the local parish vicar, and financial support from Samuel Tyzack, a local businessman. Two additional wards were added in February 1896. It became the Monkwearmouth and Southwick Hospital in 1896 and, after it moved to new facilities which opened in Newcastle Road in July 1932, it joined the National Health Service as the Sunderland Orthopaedic and Accident Hospital in 1948. A new ward for patients with mental health difficulties known as the Cleadon Ward opened at the hospital in October 2016.

References

Hospitals established in 1873
1873 establishments in England
Hospitals in Tyne and Wear
NHS hospitals in England
Sunderland